Call Capture technology is both a phone and text-based technology that captures personal data from persons who inquire for information on something; usually a property for sale or rent. After the call is placed, the system notifies a client of the name and phone number of the person calling. The system was designed to generate leads specifically for the real estate industry.

Telephony